Anei is a village and Gram panchayat in Bilhaur Tehsil, Kanpur Nagar district, Uttar Pradesh, India. The village is administrated by Gram panchayat. It is located 53 KM away from Kanpur City.

References

Villages in Kanpur Nagar district